Andrés Felipe Gallego (born November 26, 1988) is a Colombian footballer who played for the Colombia U-20 team.

He is currently playing for América de Cali. He was the Captain of the Colombia national under-20 football team that failed to qualify for the 2007 World Cup.

External links
 BDFA profile

1988 births
Living people
Association football defenders
Colombian footballers
Colombia under-20 international footballers
Independiente Medellín footballers
Envigado F.C. players
América de Cali footballers
Atlético F.C. footballers
Footballers from Medellín